Studio 100 Animation is an animation studio based in Paris and it is a subsidiary of the Belgian Studio 100 group, the studio specialises in producing TV series and films for children and families.

History 
In 2008, Studio 100 acquired the German company E.M. Entertainment and wanted to capitalise on their new property by remaking some old classics, like Maya the Bee and Vic the Viking. Therefore, they founded a new animation studio in Paris. A French studio was chosen over a Belgian one, because the animation industry in France is subsidised and therefore it was more cost-effective to produce in France.

In 2012, Studio 100 Animation opened a Licensing and Merchandising office in Paris in order to manage their properties in France.

Filmography 
A list of all series and films produced by Studio 100 Animation.

TV series

Featured films

Sister studios 
Studio 100 Animation isn’t the only animation studio of the Studio 100 Group. They also own Flying Bark Productions in Sydney & Los Angeles, Little Airplane Productions in New York City and Studio Isar Animation in Munich. The latter is owned via the German subsidiary Studio 100 Media.

References

External links 

 

Companies based in Paris
Entertainment companies established in 2008
Film production companies of France
French animation studios
2008 establishments in France
Television production companies of France